Karen Hitchcock is an Australian author and medical doctor who published her first book of short stories in 2009. She has published in both medical and literary journals, including a publication in the "Best Australian Short Stories"  and "Best Australian Essays" anthologies.

Her first book Little White Slips (Picador, 2009) was well received in the Australian media and won the 2010 Steele Rudd Award in the Queensland Premier's Literary Awards, was shortlisted in the 2010 NSW Premiers Literary Award and the Kibble/Dobie award for women writers.

Karen writes a regular column about medicine for The Monthly, and currently works as a physician in a large city hospital in Melbourne.

Bibliography

Nonfiction

Short fiction

Collections

Essays and reporting

References

External links 
  interview with Richard Fidler ABC Radio National from the Sydney Writer's Festival
 Karen Hitchcock: Little White Slips interview on Radio National's Life Matters

Year of birth missing (living people)
Living people
Australian women short story writers
The Monthly people